Mustafabeyli is a town in Ceyhan district of Adana Province, Turkey. The population of the town is 1856  as of 2015.

References

Populated places in Adana Province
Towns in Turkey
Ceyhan